Paleontology, also spelled palaeontology or palæontology, is the scientific study of life that existed prior to, and sometimes including, the start of the Holocene epoch (roughly 11,700 years before present). It includes the study of fossils to classify organisms and study their interactions with each other and their environments (their paleoecology). Paleontological observations have been documented as far back as the 5th century BC. The science became established in the 18th century as a result of Georges Cuvier's work on comparative anatomy, and developed rapidly in the 19th century.

Paleontology lies on the border between biology and geology, but differs from archaeology in that it excludes the study of anatomically modern humans. It now uses techniques drawn from a wide range of sciences, including biochemistry, mathematics, and engineering. Use of all these techniques has enabled paleontologists to discover much of the evolutionary history of life, almost all the way back to when Earth became capable of supporting life, nearly 4 billion years ago. As knowledge has increased, paleontology has developed specialised sub-divisions, some of which focus on different types of fossil organisms while others study ecology and environmental history, such as ancient climates.

Body fossils and trace fossils are the principal types of evidence about ancient life, and geochemical evidence has helped to decipher the evolution of life before there were organisms large enough to leave body fossils. Estimating the dates of these remains is essential but difficult: sometimes adjacent rock layers allow radiometric dating, which provides absolute dates that are accurate to within 0.5%, but more often paleontologists have to rely on relative dating by solving the "jigsaw puzzles" of biostratigraphy (arrangement of rock layers from youngest to oldest). Classifying ancient organisms is also difficult, as many do not fit well into the Linnaean taxonomy classifying living organisms, and paleontologists more often use cladistics to draw up evolutionary "family trees". The final quarter of the 20th century saw the development of molecular phylogenetics, which investigates how closely organisms are related by measuring the similarity of the DNA in their genomes. Molecular phylogenetics has also been used to estimate the dates when species diverged, but there is controversy about the reliability of the molecular clock on which such estimates depend.

Overview 
The simplest definition of "paleontology" is "the study of ancient life". The field seeks information about several aspects of past organisms: "their identity and origin, their environment and evolution, and what they can tell us about the Earth's organic and inorganic past".

Historical science 

William Whewell (1794–1866) classified paleontology as one of the historical sciences, along with archaeology, geology, astronomy, cosmology, philology and history itself: paleontology aims to describe phenomena of the past and to reconstruct their causes. Hence it has three main elements: description of past phenomena; developing a general theory about the causes of various types of change; and applying those theories to specific facts.
When trying to explain the past, paleontologists and other historical scientists often construct a set of one or more hypotheses about the causes and then look for a "smoking gun", a piece of evidence that strongly accords with one hypothesis over any others.
Sometimes researchers discover a "smoking gun" by a fortunate accident during other research. For example, the 1980 discovery by Luis and Walter Alvarez of iridium, a mainly extraterrestrial metal, in the Cretaceous–Tertiary boundary layer made asteroid impact the most favored explanation for the Cretaceous–Paleogene extinction event – although debate continues about the contribution of volcanism.

A complementary approach to developing scientific knowledge, experimental science,
is often said to work by conducting experiments to disprove hypotheses about the workings and causes of natural phenomena. This approach cannot prove a hypothesis, since some later experiment may disprove it, but the accumulation of failures to disprove is often compelling evidence in favor. However, when confronted with totally unexpected phenomena, such as the first evidence for invisible radiation, experimental scientists often use the same approach as historical scientists: construct a set of hypotheses about the causes and then look for a "smoking gun".

Related sciences 

Paleontology lies between biology and geology since it focuses on the record of past life, but its main source of evidence is fossils in rocks. For historical reasons, paleontology is part of the geology department at many universities: in the 19th and early 20th centuries, geology departments found fossil evidence important for dating rocks, while biology departments showed little interest.

Paleontology also has some overlap with archaeology, which primarily works with objects made by humans and with human remains, while paleontologists are interested in the characteristics and evolution of humans as a species. When dealing with evidence about humans, archaeologists and paleontologists may work together – for example paleontologists might identify animal or plant fossils around an archaeological site, to discover the people who lived there, and what they ate; or they might analyze the climate at the time of habitation.

In addition, paleontology often borrows techniques from other sciences, including biology, osteology, ecology, chemistry, physics and mathematics. For example, geochemical signatures from rocks may help to discover when life first arose on Earth, and analyses of carbon isotope ratios may help to identify climate changes and even to explain major transitions such as the Permian–Triassic extinction event. A relatively recent discipline, molecular phylogenetics, compares the DNA and RNA of modern organisms to re-construct the "family trees" of their evolutionary ancestors. It has also been used to estimate the dates of important evolutionary developments, although this approach is controversial because of doubts about the reliability of the "molecular clock". Techniques from engineering have been used to analyse how the bodies of ancient organisms might have worked, for example the running speed and bite strength of Tyrannosaurus, or the flight mechanics of Microraptor. It is relatively commonplace to study the internal details of fossils using X-ray microtomography. Paleontology, biology, archaeology, and paleoneurobiology combine to study endocranial casts (endocasts) of species related to humans to clarify the evolution of the human brain.

Paleontology even contributes to astrobiology, the investigation of possible life on other planets, by developing models of how life may have arisen and by providing techniques for detecting evidence of life.

Subdivisions 
As knowledge has increased, paleontology has developed specialised subdivisions. Vertebrate paleontology concentrates on fossils from the earliest fish to the immediate ancestors of modern mammals. Invertebrate paleontology deals with fossils such as molluscs, arthropods, annelid worms and echinoderms. Paleobotany studies fossil plants, algae, and fungi. Palynology, the study of pollen and spores produced by land plants and protists, straddles paleontology and botany, as it deals with both living and fossil organisms. Micropaleontology deals with microscopic fossil organisms of all kinds.

Instead of focusing on individual organisms, paleoecology examines the interactions between different ancient organisms, such as their food chains, and the two-way interactions with their environments.  For example, the development of oxygenic photosynthesis by bacteria caused the oxygenation of the atmosphere and hugely increased the productivity and diversity of ecosystems. Together, these led to the evolution of complex eukaryotic cells, from which all multicellular organisms are built.

Paleoclimatology, although sometimes treated as part of paleoecology, focuses more on the history of Earth's climate and the mechanisms that have changed it – which have sometimes included evolutionary developments, for example the rapid expansion of land plants in the Devonian period removed more carbon dioxide from the atmosphere, reducing the greenhouse effect and thus helping to cause an ice age in the Carboniferous period.

Biostratigraphy, the use of fossils to work out the chronological order in which rocks were formed, is useful to both paleontologists and geologists. Biogeography studies the spatial distribution of organisms, and is also linked to geology, which explains how Earth's geography has changed over time.

Sources of evidence

Body fossils 

Fossils of organisms' bodies are usually the most informative type of evidence. The most common types are wood, bones, and shells. Fossilisation is a rare event, and most fossils are destroyed by erosion or metamorphism before they can be observed. Hence the fossil record is very incomplete, increasingly so further back in time. Despite this, it is often adequate to illustrate the broader patterns of life's history. There are also biases in the fossil record: different environments are more favorable to the preservation of different types of organism or parts of organisms. Further, only the parts of organisms that were already mineralised are usually preserved, such as the shells of molluscs. Since most animal species are soft-bodied, they decay before they can become fossilised. As a result, although there are 30-plus phyla of living animals, two-thirds have never been found as fossils.

Occasionally, unusual environments may preserve soft tissues. These lagerstätten allow paleontologists to examine the internal anatomy of animals that in other sediments are represented only by shells, spines, claws, etc. – if they are preserved at all. However, even lagerstätten present an incomplete picture of life at the time. The majority of organisms living at the time are probably not represented because lagerstätten are restricted to a narrow range of environments, e.g. where soft-bodied organisms can be preserved very quickly by events such as mudslides; and the exceptional events that cause quick burial make it difficult to study the normal environments of the animals. The sparseness of the fossil record means that organisms are expected to exist long before and after they are found in the fossil record – this is known as the Signor–Lipps effect.

Trace fossils 

Trace fossils consist mainly of tracks and burrows, but also include coprolites (fossil feces) and marks left by feeding. Trace fossils are particularly significant because they represent a data source that is not limited to animals with easily fossilised hard parts, and they reflect organisms' behaviours. Also many traces date from significantly earlier than the body fossils of animals that are thought to have been capable of making them. Whilst exact assignment of trace fossils to their makers is generally impossible, traces may for example provide the earliest physical evidence of the appearance of moderately complex animals (comparable to earthworms).

Geochemical observations 

Geochemical observations may help to deduce the global level of biological activity at a certain period, or the affinity of certain fossils. For example, geochemical features of rocks may reveal when life first arose on Earth, and may provide evidence of the presence of eukaryotic cells, the type from which all multicellular organisms are built. Analyses of carbon isotope ratios may help to explain major transitions such as the Permian–Triassic extinction event.

Classifying ancient organisms 

Naming groups of organisms in a way that is clear and widely agreed is important, as some disputes in paleontology have been based just on misunderstandings over names. Linnaean taxonomy is commonly used for classifying living organisms, but runs into difficulties when dealing with newly discovered organisms that are significantly different from known ones. For example: it is hard to decide at what level to place a new higher-level grouping, e.g. genus or family or order; this is important since the Linnaean rules for naming groups are tied to their levels, and hence if a group is moved to a different level it must be renamed.

Simple example cladogram Warm-bloodedness evolved somewhere in thesynapsid–mammal transition. Warm-bloodedness must also have evolved at one of these points – an example of convergent evolution.
Paleontologists generally use approaches based on cladistics, a technique for working out the evolutionary "family tree" of a set of organisms. It works by the logic that, if groups B and C have more similarities to each other than either has to group A, then B and C are more closely related to each other than either is to A. Characters that are compared may be anatomical, such as the presence of a notochord, or molecular, by comparing sequences of DNA or proteins. The result of a successful analysis is a hierarchy of clades – groups that share a common ancestor. Ideally the "family tree" has only two branches leading from each node ("junction"), but sometimes there is too little information to achieve this, and paleontologists have to make do with junctions that have several branches. The cladistic technique is sometimes fallible, as some features, such as wings or camera eyes, evolved more than once, convergently – this must be taken into account in analyses.

Evolutionary developmental biology, commonly abbreviated to "Evo Devo", also helps paleontologists to produce "family trees", and understand fossils. For example, the embryological development of some modern brachiopods suggests that brachiopods may be descendants of the halkieriids, which became extinct in the Cambrian period.

Estimating the dates of organisms 

Paleontology seeks to map out how living things have changed through time. A substantial hurdle to this aim is the difficulty of working out how old fossils are. Beds that preserve fossils typically lack the radioactive elements needed for radiometric dating. This technique is our only means of giving rocks greater than about 50 million years old an absolute age, and can be accurate to within 0.5% or better. Although radiometric dating requires very careful laboratory work, its basic principle is simple: the rates at which various radioactive elements decay are known, and so the ratio of the radioactive element to the element into which it decays shows how long ago the radioactive element was incorporated into the rock. Radioactive elements are common only in rocks with a volcanic origin, and so the only fossil-bearing rocks that can be dated radiometrically are a few volcanic ash layers.

Consequently, paleontologists must usually rely on stratigraphy to date fossils. Stratigraphy is the science of deciphering the "layer-cake" that is the sedimentary record, and has been compared to a jigsaw puzzle. Rocks normally form relatively horizontal layers, with each layer younger than the one underneath it. If a fossil is found between two layers whose ages are known, the fossil's age must lie between the two known ages. Because rock sequences are not continuous, but may be broken up by faults or periods of erosion, it is very difficult to match up rock beds that are not directly next to one another. However, fossils of species that survived for a relatively short time can be used to link up isolated rocks: this technique is called biostratigraphy. For instance, the conodont Eoplacognathus pseudoplanus has a short range in the Middle Ordovician period. If rocks of unknown age are found to have traces of E. pseudoplanus, they must have a mid-Ordovician age. Such index fossils must be distinctive, be globally distributed and have a short time range to be useful. However, misleading results are produced if the index fossils turn out to have longer fossil ranges than first thought. Stratigraphy and biostratigraphy can in general provide only relative dating (A was before B), which is often sufficient for studying evolution. However, this is difficult for some time periods, because of the problems involved in matching up rocks of the same age across different continents.

Family-tree relationships may also help to narrow down the date when lineages first appeared. For instance, if fossils of B or C date to X million years ago and the calculated "family tree" says A was an ancestor of B and C, then A must have evolved more than X million years ago.

It is also possible to estimate how long ago two living clades diverged – i.e. approximately how long ago their last common ancestor must have lived – by assuming that DNA mutations accumulate at a constant rate. These "molecular clocks", however, are fallible, and provide only a very approximate timing: for example, they are not sufficiently precise and reliable for estimating when the groups that feature in the Cambrian explosion first evolved, and estimates produced by different techniques may vary by a factor of two.

History of life 

If, as seems likely, such a bombardment struck Earth at the same time, the first atmosphere and oceans may have been stripped away.

Some scientists have proposed that life on Earth was "seeded" from elsewhere, but most research concentrates on various explanations of how life could have arisen independently on Earth.

For about 2,000 million years microbial mats, multi-layered colonies of different bacteria, were the dominant life on Earth. This change in the atmosphere increased their effectiveness as nurseries of evolution. While eukaryotes, cells with complex internal structures, may have been present earlier, their evolution speeded up when they acquired the ability to transform oxygen from a poison to a powerful source of metabolic energy. This innovation may have come from primitive eukaryotes capturing oxygen-powered bacteria as endosymbionts and transforming them into organelles called mitochondria.

Sexual reproduction may be a prerequisite for specialisation of cells, as an asexual multicellular organism might be at risk of being taken over by rogue cells that retain the ability to reproduce.

The earliest modern-looking bilaterian animals appear in the Early Cambrian, along with several "weird wonders" that bear little obvious resemblance to any modern animals. There is a long-running debate about whether this Cambrian explosion was truly a very rapid period of evolutionary experimentation; alternative views are that modern-looking animals began evolving earlier but fossils of their precursors have not yet been found, or that the "weird wonders" are evolutionary "aunts" and "cousins" of modern groups. Vertebrates remained a minor group until the first jawed fish appeared in the Late Ordovician.

The spread of animals and plants from water to land required organisms to solve several problems, including protection against drying out and supporting themselves against gravity. Those invertebrates, as indicated by their trace and body fossils, were shown to be arthropods known as euthycarcinoids. Land plants were so successful that their detritus caused an ecological crisis in the Late Devonian, until the evolution of fungi that could digest dead wood.

During the Permian period, synapsids, including the ancestors of mammals, may have dominated land environments, but this ended with the Permian–Triassic extinction event , which came very close to wiping out all complex life. The extinctions were apparently fairly sudden, at least among vertebrates. During the slow recovery from this catastrophe a previously obscure group, archosaurs, became the most abundant and diverse terrestrial vertebrates. One archosaur group, the dinosaurs, were the dominant land vertebrates for the rest of the Mesozoic, and birds evolved from one group of dinosaurs. During this time mammals' ancestors survived only as small, mainly nocturnal insectivores, which may have accelerated the development of mammalian traits such as endothermy and hair. After the Cretaceous–Paleogene extinction event  killed off all the dinosaurs except the birds, mammals increased rapidly in size and diversity, and some took to the air and the sea.

Their rapid rise to dominance of terrestrial ecosystems is thought to have been propelled by coevolution with pollinating insects. Social insects appeared around the same time and, although they account for only small parts of the insect "family tree", now form over 50% of the total mass of all insects.

There is a long-running debate about whether modern humans are descendants of a single small population in Africa, which then migrated all over the world less than 200,000 years ago and replaced previous hominine species, or arose worldwide at the same time as a result of interbreeding.

Mass extinctions 

Life on earth has suffered occasional mass extinctions at least since . Despite their disastrous effects, mass extinctions have sometimes accelerated the evolution of life on earth. When dominance of an ecological niche passes from one group of organisms to another, this is rarely because the new dominant group outcompetes the old, but usually because an extinction event allows a new group, which may possess an advantageous trait, to outlive the old and move into its niche.

The fossil record appears to show that the rate of extinction is slowing down, with both the gaps between mass extinctions becoming longer and the average and background rates of extinction decreasing. However, it is not certain whether the actual rate of extinction has altered, since both of these observations could be explained in several ways:
 The oceans may have become more hospitable to life over the last 500 million years and less vulnerable to mass extinctions: dissolved oxygen became more widespread and penetrated to greater depths; the development of life on land reduced the run-off of nutrients and hence the risk of eutrophication and anoxic events; marine ecosystems became more diversified so that food chains were less likely to be disrupted.
 Reasonably complete fossils are very rare: most extinct organisms are represented only by partial fossils, and complete fossils are rarest in the oldest rocks. So paleontologists have mistakenly assigned parts of the same organism to different genera, which were often defined solely to accommodate these finds – the story of Anomalocaris is an example of this. The risk of this mistake is higher for older fossils because these are often unlike parts of any living organism. Many "superfluous" genera are represented by fragments that are not found again, and these "superfluous" genera are interpreted as becoming extinct very quickly.

Biodiversity in the fossil record, which is
 "the number of distinct genera alive at any given time; that is, those whose first occurrence predates and whose last occurrence postdates that time"

History 

Although paleontology became established around 1800, earlier thinkers had noticed aspects of the fossil record. The ancient Greek philosopher Xenophanes (570–480 BCE) concluded from fossil sea shells that some areas of land were once under water. During the Middle Ages the Persian naturalist Ibn Sina, known as Avicenna in Europe, discussed fossils and proposed a theory of petrifying fluids on which Albert of Saxony elaborated in the 14th century. The Chinese naturalist Shen Kuo (1031–1095) proposed a theory of climate change based on the presence of petrified bamboo in regions that in his time were too dry for bamboo.

In early modern Europe, the systematic study of fossils emerged as an integral part of the changes in natural philosophy that occurred during the Age of Reason. In the Italian Renaissance, Leonardo da Vinci made various significant contributions to the field as well as depicted numerous fossils. Leonardo's contributions are central to the history of paleontology because he established a line of continuity between the two main branches of paleontologyichnology and body fossil paleontology. He identified the following:

 The biogenic nature of ichnofossils, i.e. ichnofossils were structures left by living organisms;
 The utility of ichnofossils as paleoenvironmental toolscertain ichnofossils show the marine origin of rock strata;
 The importance of the neoichnological approachrecent traces are a key to understanding ichnofossils;
 The independence and complementary evidence of ichnofossils and body fossilsichnofossils are distinct from body fossils, but can be integrated with body fossils to provide paleontological information

At the end of the 18th century Georges Cuvier's work established comparative anatomy as a scientific discipline and, by proving that some fossil animals resembled no living ones, demonstrated that animals could become extinct, leading to the emergence of paleontology. The expanding knowledge of the fossil record also played an increasing role in the development of geology, particularly stratigraphy.

The first half of the 19th century saw geological and paleontological activity become increasingly well organised with the growth of geologic societies and museums and an increasing number of professional geologists and fossil specialists. Interest increased for reasons that were not purely scientific, as geology and paleontology helped industrialists to find and exploit natural resources such as coal.
This contributed to a rapid increase in knowledge about the history of life on Earth and to progress in the definition of the geologic time scale, largely based on fossil evidence. Although she was rarely recognised by the scientific community, Mary Anning was a significant contributor to the field of palaeontology during this period; she uncovered multiple novel Mesozoic reptile fossils and deducted that what were then known as bezoar stones are in fact fossilised faeces. In 1822 Henri Marie Ducrotay de Blainville, editor of Journal de Physique, coined the word "palaeontology" to refer to the study of ancient living organisms through fossils. As knowledge of life's history continued to improve, it became increasingly obvious that there had been some kind of successive order to the development of life. This encouraged early evolutionary theories on the transmutation of species.
After Charles Darwin published Origin of Species in 1859, much of the focus of paleontology shifted to understanding evolutionary paths, including human evolution, and evolutionary theory.

The last half of the 19th century saw a tremendous expansion in paleontological activity, especially in North America. The trend continued in the 20th century with additional regions of the Earth being opened to systematic fossil collection. Fossils found in China near the end of the 20th century have been particularly important as they have provided new information about the earliest evolution of animals, early fish, dinosaurs and the evolution of birds. The last few decades of the 20th century saw a renewed interest in mass extinctions and their role in the evolution of life on Earth. There was also a renewed interest in the Cambrian explosion that apparently saw the development of the body plans of most animal phyla. The discovery of fossils of the Ediacaran biota and developments in paleobiology extended knowledge about the history of life back far before the Cambrian.

Increasing awareness of Gregor Mendel's pioneering work in genetics led first to the development of population genetics and then in the mid-20th century to the modern evolutionary synthesis, which explains evolution as the outcome of events such as mutations and horizontal gene transfer, which provide genetic variation, with genetic drift and natural selection driving changes in this variation over time. Within the next few years the role and operation of DNA in genetic inheritance were discovered, leading to what is now known as the "Central Dogma" of molecular biology. In the 1960s molecular phylogenetics, the investigation of evolutionary "family trees" by techniques derived from biochemistry, began to make an impact, particularly when it was proposed that the human lineage had diverged from apes much more recently than was generally thought at the time. Although this early study compared proteins from apes and humans, most molecular phylogenetics research is now based on comparisons of RNA and DNA.

Paleontology in the vernacular press 
Books catered to the general public on paleontology include:

 The Last Days of the Dinosaurs: An Asteroid Extinction, and the Beginning of our World written by Riley Black
 The Rise and Reign of the Mammals: A New History, from the Shadow of the Dinosaurs to Us written by Steve Brusatte
 Otherlands: A Journey Through Earth's Extinct Worlds written by Thomas Halliday

See also 

 
 
 
  (with link directory)
 List of notable fossils
 List of paleontologists
 List of transitional fossils
 
 
 
 
 
 
 
 
 Une Femme ou Deux - French screwball comedy romance film starring Gérard Depardieu as a paleontologist.

Notes

References

External links 

 Smithsonian's Paleobiology website
 University of California Museum of Paleontology
 The Paleontological Society
 The Palaeontological Association
 The Society of Vertebrate Paleontology
 The Paleontology Portal
 "Geology, Paleontology & Theories of the Earth" – a collection of more than 100 digitised landmark and early books on Earth sciences at the Linda Hall Library

 
Earth sciences
Evolutionary biology

Historical geology